Hilde Strømsvold (born 17 August 1967) is a Norwegian former football goalkeeper who played for the Norway women's national football team.

She played on the Norwegian team that won silver medals at the 1991 FIFA Women's World Cup in China.

References

External links

1967 births
Living people
Norwegian women's footballers
Women's association football goalkeepers
Toppserien players
Asker Fotball (women) players
Klepp IL players
1991 FIFA Women's World Cup players
Norway women's international footballers